IPCE may stand for:

 Ipče Ahmedovski (1966–1994), Serbian and Macedonian folk singer
 Incident photon to converted electron, a synonym for the quantum efficiency of a solar cell
 Ipce, formerly International Pedophile and Child Emancipation, a pedophile  advocacy organization
 Spanish Cultural Heritage Institute or Sede del Instituto del Patrimonio Cultural de España